Rajkumari Ratnavati Girl's School is a girl's school in the rural thar desert of  Jaisalmer  in northern India.The school is unique in that the architects designed it in the shape of an oval that can withstand temperatures of up to 50 degrees Celsius. The school can accommodate 400 girls from kindergarten to tenth grade. The school is aimed to provide education and training in traditional skill sets such as artistry, weaving, embroidery for women. Local craftsmen built the school out of hand-cut local sandstone. Rajkumari Ratnavati Girl's School is designed by a New York based company Diana Kellogg Architects.

History 
The school is named after "Ratnavati," the Jaisalmer princess. She was the daughter of Maharawal Ratan Singh.

School uniform 
Sabyasachi Mukherjee designed the school uniform doing Ajrak, a local printing technique similar to printing.

Architecture 
Rajkumari Ratnavati Girl's School is located in the rural region surrounding Jaisalmer, near the hamlet of Kanoi. Its architecture is unique and distinctive, featuring an oval-shaped building amidst the desert landscape. The elliptical shaped structure, angled towards the prevailing winds, is designed to effectively circulate cool air and symbolizes femininity, aligning with the project's ethos. Kellogg, the designer and architect of the school, refers to it as "a big, tight hug." Oval geometry of the school symbolizes the strength of women.

Building material 
Kellogg employed traditional methods in the design of the structure, one of which was the application of lime plaster on the interior walls. Lime plaster is a natural, porous material that has a cooling effect. Additionally, she incorporated a  wall into the design, which is a sandstone grid that promotes acceleration of wind through the Venturi effect.
The school is made of local yellow sandstone that was handcrafted by local artisans. The building is designed in a way that it does not require the use of air conditioning.

Building 
The school is one of three buildings in the complex known as the "Gyaan Centre."
 The Medha Hall-The Medha Hall is an area designated for a library and a museum, and a space for performances and art exhibitions for local crafts such as textiles. The women could learn local weaving and embroidery techniques.
The courtyard has a rainwater harvesting facility.

Awards 

 The school was awarded the AD100 – an annual survey of the best names in design by Architectural Digest.

CITTA 
The royal family of Jaisalmer and Manvendra Singh Shekhawat donated the land for the school. Diana kellogg architects, in collaboration with CITTA, which is a registered nonprofit organization in New York, have made a significant contribution to the building of the school.

References

External links 

 foundation

Girls' schools in Rajasthan
Jaisalmer